Mauricio Valencia (born 28 December 1987) is a Colombian Paralympic athlete with cerebral palsy. He represented Colombia at the Summer Paralympics in 2012, 2016 and 2021. At the 2016 Summer Paralympics, he won two medals: the gold medal in the men's javelin throw F34 event and the bronze medal in the men's shot put F34 event. In 2021, he won the silver medal in the men's javelin throw F34 event at the 2020 Summer Paralympics held in Tokyo, Japan.

Career 

He represented Colombia at the 2011 Parapan American Games held in Guadalajara, Mexico. In total he won two medals: the gold medal in the men's discus throw F32/33/34 event and the silver medal in the men's shot put F32/33/34 event.

At the 2013 World Championships held in Lyon, France, he won the bronze medal in the men's javelin throw F33/34 event. Two years later, at the 2015 World Championships held in Doha, Qatar, he won three medals: the silver medal in both the men's discus throw F34 and men's javelin throw F34 events and the bronze medal in the men's shot put F34 event. In 2017, he won gold in the men's javelin throw F34 event and bronze in the men's shot put F34 event.

In the men's javelin throw F34 event at the 2019 World Championships held in Dubai, United Arab Emirates he won the gold medal with a distance of 35.25m. He also won the bronze medal in the men's shot put F34 event.

Achievements

References

External links 
 

Living people
1987 births
Place of birth missing (living people)
Track and field athletes with cerebral palsy
Athletes (track and field) at the 2012 Summer Paralympics
Athletes (track and field) at the 2016 Summer Paralympics
Athletes (track and field) at the 2020 Summer Paralympics
Medalists at the 2016 Summer Paralympics
Medalists at the 2020 Summer Paralympics
Paralympic athletes of Colombia
Paralympic gold medalists for Colombia
Paralympic silver medalists for Colombia
Paralympic bronze medalists for Colombia
Colombian male discus throwers
Colombian male javelin throwers
Colombian male shot putters
World Para Athletics Championships winners
Paralympic medalists in athletics (track and field)
Medalists at the 2011 Parapan American Games
Medalists at the 2019 Parapan American Games
21st-century Colombian people